Francis Patrick Mount (17 March 1903 – 30 September 1989) was an Australian rules footballer who played with Carlton in the Victorian Football League (VFL).

Notes

External links 

Frank Mount's profile at Blueseum

1903 births
1989 deaths
Carlton Football Club players
Australian rules footballers from Victoria (Australia)